Progress M-64, identified by NASA as Progress 29P, was a Progress spacecraft used to resupply the International Space Station. It was a Progress-M 11F615A55 spacecraft, with the serial number 364.

Launch
Progress M-64 was launched by a Soyuz-U carrier rocket from Site 1/5 at the Baikonur Cosmodrome. Launch occurred at 20:22 UTC on 14 May 2008.

Docking
The spacecraft docked with the nadir port of the Zarya module at 21:39:20 UTC on 16 May 2008, two minutes behind schedule, by means of the Kurs system. Following undocking at 19:46 UTC on 1 September 2008, it spent a week in free-flight conducting experiments for the Plazma-Progress programme. It was deorbited on 8 September 2008, with the deorbit burn beginning at 20:47 UTC. The spacecraft burned up in the atmosphere over the Pacific Ocean, with any remaining debris landing in the ocean at around 21:33 UTC.

Cargo
Progress M-64 carried  of cargo to the International Space Station.  of this was dry cargo, including food for the crew, equipment for conducting scientific research, and a replacement Sokol KV-2 spacesuit for Sergey Volkov, as his original suit had been damaged. It also carried a docking target for attaching the MRM-2 module to the zenith port of the Zvezda module.

See also

 List of Progress flights
 Uncrewed spaceflights to the International Space Station

References

Spacecraft launched in 2008
Progress (spacecraft) missions
Spacecraft which reentered in 2008
Supply vehicles for the International Space Station
Spacecraft launched by Soyuz-U rockets